St. Ives Town Football Club is a football club based in St Ives, Cambridgeshire, England.

History
St Ives Town Football Club was formed in 1887. They joined the Central Amateur League in 1949, but the league folded at the end of the 1949–50 season. The club briefly played in the United Counties Football League Division Two for two seasons in the early 1950s. They rejoined the United Counties Football League Division One in 1985–86, and gained promotion to the Premier Division in 2004–05 after a third-placed finish. They reached the Fifth Round of the FA Vase in 2007–08, 2008–09 and 2009–10, and reached the Quarter Finals in 2011–12. They won promotion to the Southern Football League after finishing second in the United Counties League Premier Division in 2012–13. They also produced Conor Washington who now plays at Charlton Athletic F.C. and has made several appearances for Northern Ireland. In the 2015–16 season, the club earned promotion to the Southern League Premier Division via the play-offs, defeating AFC Rushden & Diamonds in the final on 2 May 2016 in front of 1,523.

Current squad
 

The Southern Football League does not use a squad numbering system.

Management and coaching staff

Boardroom

Current staff

Managerial history

Records
FA Cup
Fourth Qualifying Round 2022-23
FA Vase
Quarter Finals 2011–12

See also
St Ives Town F.C. players

References

External links
St Ives Town official website

Football clubs in Cambridgeshire
Association football clubs established in 1887
Southern Football League clubs
United Counties League
1887 establishments in England
Football clubs in England
Central Amateur League
Town Football Club